AMG-3 (part of the AM cannabinoid series) is an analgesic drug which is a cannabinoid agonist. It is a derivative of Δ8THC substituted with a dithiolane group on the 3-position side chain. AMG-3 is a potent agonist at both CB1 and CB2 receptors with a Ki of 0.32nM at CB1 and 0.52nM at CB2, and its particularly high binding affinity has led to it being used as a template for further structural development of novel cannabinoid drugs. It has sedative and analgesic effects, with analgesia lasting for up to 36 hours after administration.

See also
AMG-36
AMG-41

References

External links

Cannabinoids
Benzochromenes
Phenols
Dithiolanes